Hıdırköy can refer to:

 Hıdırköy, Bandırma
 Hıdırköy, İpsala